= Neo-Georgian =

Neo-Georgian may refer to:

- A revival of Georgian architecture
  - Colonial Revival architecture, in North America
  - Neo-Georgian style (Great Britain), a revival of Georgian architecture in the United Kingdom in the 20th century
